Furong is a town in Yongshun County, Xiangxi Prefecture, Hunan.  The town, also advertised as Furong Ancient Town, is a tourist attraction in mountainous northwest Hunan, approximately halfway between the popular tourist destinations of Fenghuang County and Zhangjiajie. The town is well known for its scenic location, situated on cliffs above a waterfall that falls into the You River.

Furong was originally known as Wangcun, but was renamed following the success of the eponymous film, Hibiscus Town.  The Tujia people were the original inhabitants of Wancun, and today Furong consists of a mix of Tujia and Han Chinese peoples.

It is located on the Zhangjiajie–Jishou–Huaihua high-speed railway, opened in late 2021.

See also 
 List of township-level divisions of Hunan

References

Divisions of Yongshun County
Towns of Xiangxi Tujia and Miao Autonomous Prefecture